WinStar World Casino and Resort is an American tribal casino and hotel located in Thackerville, Oklahoma, near the Oklahoma–Texas state line. It is owned and operated by the Chickasaw Nation. The casino opened as the WinStar Casinos in 2004, and was expanded (with a 395-room hotel tower) and renamed WinStar World Casino in 2009; its  of casino floor made it the world's largest casino. In August 2013, WinStar Resorts completed a major expansion project, which added a new 1000-room second hotel tower that was divided into two phases; this also added a new casino that is attached to the tower. As a result of the completion of this expansion, the casino overtook Foxwoods Resort Casino to become the largest casino in the United States and one of the largest in the world based on gaming floor space. WinStar has over 8,600 electronic games, a 55-table poker room, 100 total table games including craps and roulette, Racer's off-track betting, and multiple high limit rooms.

Location and history 
WinStar World Casino and Resort is located about 120 miles south from the Oklahoma City metropolitan area and one hour north of the Dallas-Fort Worth metroplex and attracts many people from the North Texas region as well as Oklahoma residents. The casino's 3,500 seat Global Event Center has been home to some popular entertainment attractions including Jay Leno, Vince Gill, Adam Lambert, Weezer, Lil Wayne, ZZ Top, Maroon 5, Kid Rock, Tony Bennett, and Davy Jones, who gave his final concert at WinStar on February 19, 2012.

WinStar World Casino and Resort is the biggest casino in the United States, in terms of the total number of table games and gaming machines, according to many gambling blogs and casino directories.

The casino closed temporarily between March 16 to March 31, 2020, due to the 2019–20 coronavirus pandemic as announced by Chickasaw Nation Governor Bill Anoatubby. The casino was closed throughout the remainder of April 2020. The casino reopened on in May 2020, with restrictive guidelines.

Design 
WinStar was conceived by noted designer Larry E. Seitz whose work includes Sands Casinos, Trump Taj Mahal, Grand Casinos in Mississippi, Barona Casino, Buffalo Run, Chisholm Trail, Grand Princess, SS Norway, Casino Panama, Costa Rica Casino, Stellaris Casino Aruba, and the Paradise Island Casino among others. Additionally Hotels created for the brands Hilton, Hyatt, Sheraton, Marriott, Crowne Plaza, Melina, Loews, Holiday, Ramada, InterContinental,  and independents worldwide. Restaurants and Clubs have been produced internationally.
Special effects, commissioned art, and sculptures were constructed and implemented by Dallas-based ValueWorks and produced by their suppliers in the U.S. and around the world.
The exterior of the building was detailed by Lyndon Stromberg, who also worked on The Venetian and the MGM Grand in Las Vegas as well as the Atlantis Paradise Island Resort in the Bahamas and Planet Hollywood in New York City. The long façade exterior of WinStar World Casino features replicas of London's Parliament Building, Rome's Coliseum and the Arc de Triomphe from Paris.

Hotel information
WinStar World Casino Hotel includes three hotel towers and 1,399 rooms. On August 6, 2009, the original 395-room hotel tower held a grand opening celebration that featured performances by American Idol winner Kelly Clarkson and American rock band Lynyrd Skynyrd. Meeting rooms that have varied capacities of 10-200 people, a resort-style pool with a custom-built waterfall grotto, the Spa at WinStar, ONYX Boutique and the Isle at WinStar gift shop. WinStar World Casino and Resort offers a variety of restaurants, many of which are open until late night hours, including Dallas Cowboys Bar & Grill. The second hotel tower, the Pool Tower North, opened in August 2013, while the third hotel tower, the Pool Tower South, opened in early 2014. Both towers have a capacity of 500 rooms each and are adjacent to each other. The Inn at WinStar has 101 rooms, and is accessed from the casino and the RV park by a 24-hour shuttle service.

The casino is 18+.

Offsite areas

WinStar Golf Club
The WinStar Golf Club features two 18-hole championship golf courses designed by former PGA Tour Pro, D.A. Weibring.  In addition, the WinStar Golf Academy, a  facility, offers private golf lessons.

WinStar RV Park
The FunTown RV park at WinStar is a 200-space RV Park that is available to people visiting the casino. A shuttle service to the casino is available to guests in the RV Park.

References

External links

Casinos in Oklahoma
Hotels in Oklahoma
Chickasaw Nation casinos
Buildings and structures in Love County, Oklahoma
Tourist attractions in Love County, Oklahoma
Buildings and structures completed in 2004
Novelty buildings in Oklahoma
Casino hotels
2004 establishments in Oklahoma